Febvin-Palfart  is a commune in the Pas-de-Calais department in the Hauts-de-France region of France.

Geography
A farming village situated 14 miles (22 km) south of Saint-Omer, at the D95 and D77 road junction.

It is surrounded by the communes Westrehem, Fontaine-lès-Hermans and Fléchin. Febvin-Palfart is located 18 km northwest of Bruay-la-Buissière, the largest nearby city.

Population

Places of interest
 The church of St. Berthe, dating from the fifteenth century
 Two chapels
 A war memorial

See also
Communes of the Pas-de-Calais department

References

Febvinpalfart